In enzymology, a di-trans,poly-cis-decaprenylcistransferase is an enzyme that catalyzes the chemical reaction

di-trans,poly-cis-decaprenyl diphosphate + isopentenyl diphosphate  diphosphate + di-trans,poly-cis-undecaprenyl diphosphate

Thus, the two substrates of this enzyme are di-trans,poly-cis-decaprenyl diphosphate and isopentenyl diphosphate, whereas its two products are diphosphate and di-trans,poly-cis-undecaprenyl diphosphate.

This enzyme belongs to the family of transferases, specifically those transferring aryl or alkyl groups other than methyl groups.  The systematic name of this enzyme class is di-trans,poly-cis-decaprenyl-diphosphate:isopentenyl-diphosphate undecaprenylcistransferase. Other names in common use include di-trans,poly-cis-undecaprenyl-diphosphate synthase, undecaprenyl-diphosphate synthase, bactoprenyl-diphosphate synthase, UPP synthetase, undecaprenyl diphosphate synthetase, and undecaprenyl pyrophosphate synthetase.  This enzyme participates in terpenoid biosynthesis.

Structural studies

References

 
 

EC 2.5.1
Enzymes of known structure